USS Hazel is a name used more than once by the United States Navy, and may refer to:

 , a patrol boat in commission from 1917 to 1919
 , later YN-29, a net laying ship in commission from 1942 to 1958

United States Navy ship names